Green City Presbyterian Church is a historic Presbyterian church at One East Street in Green City, Sullivan County, Missouri.  It was built in 1918, and is a two-story, Classical Revival style brick church building.  The front facade features a full-height portico supported by limestone Tuscan order columns.

It was listed on the National Register of Historic Places in 2000.

References

Presbyterian churches in Missouri
Churches on the National Register of Historic Places in Missouri
Neoclassical architecture in Missouri
Churches completed in 1918
Buildings and structures in Sullivan County, Missouri
National Register of Historic Places in Sullivan County, Missouri
Neoclassical church buildings in the United States